Arthur E. Ford (1903 – 14 July 1986) was a wrestler who represent Australia at the 1928 Summer Olympics.

Ford competed in the freestyle bantamweight contest at the 1928 Summer Olympics held in Amsterdam. Ford lost his first round bout against Swiss wrestler Amedée Piguet, so did not advance any further.

References

External links
 

1903 births
1986 deaths
Olympic wrestlers of Australia
Wrestlers at the 1928 Summer Olympics
Australian male sport wrestlers